Jason Mraz's Beautiful Mess: Live on Earth is a live album and DVD by the American singer/songwriter Jason Mraz, released in 2009. It was recorded on August 13, 2009, in Chicago at the Charter One Pavilion.

It has been certified Gold in Brazil.

Track listing
"Intro"
"Sunshine Song"
"Traveler"/"Make It Mine"
"Anything You Want"
"Coyotes"
"Live High"
"Only Human"
"The Remedy"
"The Dynamo of Volition"
"A Beautiful Mess"
"I'm Yours"
"Lucky" (And. Colbie Caillat)
"Copchase"
"All Night Long"
"Fall Through Glass" (DVD only)
"Butterfly"
"The Boy's Gone"
"You and I Both" (iTunes pre-order only)

DVD extras
"Un Beau Désodre"
"We Sing. We Dance. We Make Videos."
"Interview with attendees Elvin and Lisa Carmichael."

Production
A&R: Sam Riback
Marketing: Dane Venable
Art direction + Design: Greg Gigendad Burke
Illustration: Luca Tieri
Photography: Darren Ankenman and Jeff Nicholas
DVD directed by Darren Doane
Music mixed by John Alagía and Jon Altschiller

Charts

References

Jason Mraz albums
2009 live albums
2009 video albums
Live video albums
Atlantic Records live albums
Atlantic Records video albums